Nezha Rahil is a Moroccan actress. She is known for her frequent appearances in her husband Faouzi Bensaïdi's films.

Filmography

Feature films 

 1995: Chevaux de fortune
 1998: Adieu forain
 2003: A Thousand Months (Mille mois)
 2006: WWW: What a Wonderful World
 2007: Number One
 2011: Death for Sale (Mort à vendre)
 2015: Fatima
 2017: Volubilis

Short films 

 2000: Trajets
 2000: Le Mur

References

External links 
 

Year of birth missing (living people)
Living people
Moroccan film actresses
21st-century Moroccan actresses